American Sonnets for My Past and Future Assassin is a 2018 collection of more than seventy sonnets by Terrance Hayes. Written after the 2016 American elections, this collection treats topics like racism, masculinity, and politics. It was a finalist for the 2018 National Book Award for poetry, and was shortlisted for the T. S. Eliot Prize for 2018.

Title and theme 
The title of the collection, "American Sonnets for My Past and Future Assassin" (singularized to “American Sonnet”) is also the title of each poem in the book. Each sonnet addresses contemporary issues of American society and its politics. After the 2016 U.S election, the author decided to write political poems. and directly addresses Donald Trump in some poems and does not hesitate to mock him, calling him "Mister Trumpet".

The collection was inspired by Wanda Coleman's series of "American Sonnets"  In the sonnets Hayes deplores the rising violence related to racism in America. He raises some old themes in American literature like the cage of masculinity or the relationship between father and son in passages like: “Christianity is a religion built around a father/Who does not rescue his son. It is the story/of a son whose father is a ghost."

Critical Reception 
Spencer Hupp of The Sewanee Review sees the collection as a reminder of American suffering, because of racial violence but with hope for a better future: "If this book’s 1,148 uneven but often stunning lines prove anything, it’s that the threat of hate, the hope for personal redemption, and the possibility for reconciliation can be as much alive in art as they are in the culture that creates it."

References 

2018 poetry books
American poetry collections
Penguin Books books